The discography of Rammstein, a German rock band, consists of eight studio albums, three live albums, and six video albums. Rammstein has also released 33 singles, 30 of which are accompanied by music videos. The band was formed in the mid-1990s by six musicians from East Berlin and Schwerin: singer Till Lindemann, guitarists Richard Kruspe and Paul Landers, keyboardist Flake Lorenz, bassist Oliver Riedel, and drummer Christoph Schneider.

Rammstein debuted with the single "Du riechst so gut", released on 24 August 1995 in a scented digipack format. A month later, the band issued their first studio album, Herzeleid, which peaked at number six on the German Media Control Charts and remained there for 102 weeks. Before the release of their second studio album, Rammstein issued the single "Engel"; the track was featured in the closing credits of the 1997 film Mortal Kombat: Annihilation, while the song's music video itself was a tribute to the movie From Dusk till Dawn, released on 1 April 1997. Engel reached the top three on the German singles chart and was certified gold by the Bundesverband Musikindustrie (BVMI) for the sale of more than 250,000 copies.

Rammstein's second album, Sehnsucht, was released in August 1997; it topped both German and Austrian charts, and eventually was certified platinum in the respective record industry associations of IFPI. On 30 August 1999, the band released their first live album, Live aus Berlin. It was recorded over two nights at the Wuhlheide Venue, and issued on both CD and DVD formats. Released in April 2001, Mutter is Rammstein's third studio album; it topped the German and Swiss charts and was certified double platinum in both countries. Five tracks were released from the album as singles: "Sonne", "Links 2 3 4", "Ich will", "Mutter" and "Feuer frei!"; the latter was also used in the opening scenes of the Rob Cohen film xXx. In 2003, the group released the DVD Lichtspielhaus, containing live performances, music videos, and interviews.

On 26 July 2004, Rammstein released the single "Mein Teil", a song inspired by a German cannibal, Armin Meiwes, which peaked at number two on both German and Finnish charts. Later that year, the band released their fourth studio album, Reise, Reise; it topped the Austrian, Finnish, German and Swiss charts, and was certified platinum in the last two countries. Other singles from this album include "Amerika", "Ohne dich" and "Keine Lust". Released worldwide on 28 October 2005, Rosenrot peaked at number one in Germany, Austria, and Finland, and was certified gold in Austria and Finland and platinum in Germany. The album spawned the singles "Rosenrot", the homosexuality-themed "Mann gegen Mann" and "Benzin". "Benzin" reached the top of the Danish Tracklisten. In November 2006, the band issued the Völkerball CD and DVD set, featuring live footage filmed in the United Kingdom, France, Japan and Russia, plus a documentary. It peaked at number one in the German and Finnish charts, and was certificated double platinum by BVMI. They have since released three more studio albums, one compilation album, and one live album: Liebe ist für alle da in 2009, Made in Germany (1995-2011) in 2011, Rammstein: Paris in 2017, Untitled in 2019, and Zeit in 2022.

Albums

Studio albums

Live albums

Compilation albums

Box sets

Singles

Other charted songs

Videography

Video albums

Music videos

Notes

References

Heavy metal group discographies
Discography
Discographies of German artists